In mathematics, a derivation is a function on an algebra which generalizes certain features of the derivative operator.  Specifically, given an algebra A over a ring or a field K, a K-derivation is a K-linear map  that satisfies Leibniz's law:

More generally, if M is an A-bimodule, a K-linear map  that satisfies the Leibniz law is also called a derivation. The collection of all K-derivations of A to itself is denoted by DerK(A).

Derivations occur in many different contexts in diverse areas of mathematics.  The partial derivative with respect to a variable is an R-derivation on the algebra of real-valued differentiable functions on Rn.  The Lie derivative with respect to a vector field is an R-derivation on the algebra of differentiable functions on a differentiable manifold; more generally it is a derivation on the tensor algebra of a manifold. It follows that the adjoint representation of a Lie algebra is a derivation on that algebra. The Pincherle derivative is an example of a derivation in abstract algebra. If the algebra A is noncommutative, then the commutator with respect to an element of the algebra A defines a linear endomorphism of A to itself, which is a derivation over K. That is,

An algebra A equipped with a distinguished derivation d forms a differential algebra, and is itself a significant object of study in areas such as differential Galois theory.

Properties

 If A has a unit 1, then D(1) = D(12) = 2D(1), so that D(1) = 0. Thus by K-linearity, D(k) = 0 for all .
 If A is commutative, D(x2) = xD(x) + D(x)x = 2xD(x), and D(xn) = nxn−1D(x), by the Leibniz rule.
 More generally, for any , it follows by induction that 

 For n>1, Dn is not a derivation, instead satisfying a higher-order Leibniz rule:

Moreover, if M is an A-bimodule, write
 
for the set of K-derivations from A to M.
  is a module over K.  
 DerK(A) is a Lie algebra with Lie bracket defined by the commutator:

since it is readily verified that the commutator of two derivations is again a derivation.
 There is an A-module  (called the Kähler differentials) with a K-derivation  through which any derivation  factors. That is, for any derivation D there is a A-module map  with
 
 The correspondence  is an isomorphism of A-modules:
 
If  is a subring, then A inherits a k-algebra structure, so there is an inclusion

since any K-derivation is a fortiori a k-derivation.

Graded derivations 

Given a graded algebra A and a homogeneous linear map D of grade  on A, D is a homogeneous derivation if 

for every homogeneous element a and every element b of A for a commutator factor .  A graded derivation is sum of homogeneous derivations with the same ε.

If , this definition reduces to the usual case.  If , however, then
 
for odd , and D is called an anti-derivation.

Examples of anti-derivations include the exterior derivative and the interior product acting on differential forms.

Graded derivations of superalgebras (i.e. Z2-graded algebras) are often called superderivations.

Related notions

Hasse–Schmidt derivations are K-algebra homomorphisms

Composing further with the map which sends a formal power series  to the coefficient  gives a derivation.

See also
In differential geometry derivations are tangent vectors
Kähler differential
Hasse derivative
p-derivation
Wirtinger derivatives
Derivative of the exponential map

References
 .
 .
 .
 .

Differential algebra